Carl Otte (June 24, 1923 – January 13, 2011) was an American Democratic politician and legislator from Wisconsin.

Born in Sheboygan, Wisconsin, Otte served in the United States Army during World War II. Otte worked in a leather company and served on the Sheboygan County, Wisconsin Board of Supervisors. He served in the Wisconsin State Assembly 1967–1983 and then the Wisconsin State Senate 1983–1987.

Notes

Politicians from Sheboygan, Wisconsin
Military personnel from Wisconsin
County supervisors in Wisconsin
Democratic Party members of the Wisconsin State Assembly
Democratic Party Wisconsin state senators
1923 births
2011 deaths